Cauchy's inequality may refer to:

 the Cauchy–Schwarz inequality in a real or complex inner product space
 Cauchy's inequality for the Taylor series coefficients of a complex analytic function